East Central Guadalcanal is a single-member constituency of the National Parliament of Solomon Islands. Located on the island of Guadalcanal, it was established in 1993 when Parliament was expanded from 38 to 47 seats; Its first MP, Hilda Kari, had served as the MP for North East Guadalcanal between 1989 and 1993.

List of MPs

Election results

2014

2010

2006

2001

1997

1993

References

Solomon Islands parliamentary constituencies
1993 establishments in the Solomon Islands
Constituencies established in 1993